Omicron Columbae  is a star in the southern constellation Columba. It has an apparent visual magnitude of 4.81, which is bright enough to be faintly visible to the naked eye. The distance to this star, as determined by an annual parallax shift of 30.82 mas, is 105.8 light years.  The visual magnitude is reduced by an interstellar absorption factor of 0.06 due to intervening dust.

Depending on the source, this star has been given a stellar classification of K1 III or K1 IV, suggesting that it is a K-type star currently in the subgiant or giant stage of its evolution. It has 1.57 times the Sun's mass and has expanded to more than five times the radius of the Sun. The star appears to be spinning slowly with a projected rotational velocity of 1.2 km/s, and is around 2.2 billion years old. It is estimated to radiate 15.5 times the solar luminosity from its outer atmosphere at an effective temperature of 4,936 K.

Omicron Columbae is a high proper motion star that may share a common proper motion with the object WISE J051723.87−345121.8. The two have an angular separation of 159 arc seconds.

References

K-type giants
Columba (constellation)
Columbae, Omicron
Durchmusterung objects
034642
024659
01743